Słomowo may refer to the following places:
Słomowo, Oborniki County in Greater Poland Voivodeship (west-central Poland)
Słomowo, Września County in Greater Poland Voivodeship (west-central Poland)
Słomowo, Kuyavian-Pomeranian Voivodeship (north-central Poland)
Słomowo, Warmian-Masurian Voivodeship (north Poland)